The 1972 United States presidential election in Texas was held on November 7, 1972, as part of the 1972 United States presidential election. Incumbent Republican President Richard Nixon overwhelmingly won the state of Texas with 66.20% of the vote, to the Democratic Party candidate George McGovern’s 33.24%, thus giving him the state’s 26 electoral votes. This result made Texas 9.8% more Republican than the nation-at-large. This was the first time a Republican won the state of Texas since Texas-born Dwight D. Eisenhower won it in 1956.

Nixon’s win in Texas made him the first ever Republican presidential candidate to break sixty percent of Texas’ popular vote in a presidential election, surpassing former President Dwight D. Eisenhower's performance of 55.26% in 1956, and even native son Lyndon B. Johnson’s 63.32% in 1964. Nixon is so far the only Republican candidate to break 65% of the state’s popular vote. At the county level, 246 of Texas’ 254 counties voted for Nixon, all by wide margins except heavily black Robertson County where Nixon won by a single vote. Nixon won 22 of Texas’ 24 congressional districts – with the 18th (Harris County) and 20th (Bexar County) constituting the only congressional districts McGovern won anywhere in the former Confederacy. McGovern, however, did not win either county each of these districts were located in.

McGovern's only county wins came from the south Texas region along the U.S.-Mexico border and Cottle County in the northern part of the state, though even his performances here were underwhelming. In fact, in the oldest extant Democratic stronghold in the entire United States, Nixon became the only Republican since Dwight D. Eisenhower in 1952 to win Dimmit County and Presidio County, and the only Republican apart from Eisenhower's two victories there to win Hidalgo County and Wilacy County since it was created in 1921. This is also the last election at which Zavala County has voted Republican, though that county did so even in 1960. Duval County, however, gave McGovern over 85 percent of the vote, which was the highest percentage of votes he received in any county nationally. 1972 was the third successive election when Duval proved the most Democratic county in the nation. Taking the region of South Texas to include all the above-mentioned counties (La Salle, Hidalgo, Dimmit, Jim Wells, Wilacy, Zavala, & Duval) as well as Maverick, Frio, Webb, Zapata, Jim Hogg, Starr, Brooks, Cameron, Kenedy, Kleberg, Nueces, and San Patricio, Nixon is to date the only Republican or non-Democrat to win a majority of said counties since Texas achieved statehood in 1848.

Nixon had previously narrowly lost Texas to John F. Kennedy in 1960 and had lost it narrowly again to Hubert Humphrey in 1968. However, as with the rest of the country in 1972, with the exception of Massachusetts and Washington, D.C., Texas voted for the Republican ticket of incumbent Nixon and Agnew.

As of the 2020 presidential election, this is the best Republican election performance in Texas, as well as the last time every single county in the Texas Triangle was won by the Republican candidate.

Campaign

McGovern campaign
In the national race, McGovern was constantly portrayed throughout the election campaign as being a left-wing extremist because of his support for busing and civil rights, plus his opposition to the Vietnam War, support for granting amnesty to draft dodgers. and support for a thousand-dollar giveaway to each American as a solution to poverty. McGovern was also viewed as inconsistent following the replacement of his first running mate, Thomas Eagleton, while many Republican campaigners believed McGovern would legalize abortion and illicit drugs if he were elected – despite the fact that his ultimate running mate Sargent Shriver was firmly pro-life.

McGovern's Texas campaign was managed by Bill Clinton. Senator Lloyd Bentsen had originally been asked to manage the Texas campaign, but declined.

While those working on the campaign expected McGovern to lose in Texas, they aimed to decrease his margin of defeat. McGovern's campaign received little support from Democratic statewide officeholders. Additionally, Dolph Briscoe, the Democratic nominee in the coinciding 1972 Texas gubernatorial election refused to make any campaign appearances alongside McGovern. One of the few statewide office holders to support McGovern's campaign was Texas Land Commissioner Bob Armstrong. Lloyd Bentsen also endorsed McGovern.

Gonzo journalist Hunter S. Thompson would occasionally observe the Texas campaign operation. In addition to manager Bill Clinton, a future United States president, and his then-girlfriend (and future wife) Hillary, a future Democratic Party presidential nominee herself, there were a number of individuals who worked on McGovern's Texas campaign effort who would later achieve individual notability.

Role of the Clintons
Bill Clinton, and his then-girlfriend (and future wife) Hillary (both Yale Law School students at the time) had both moved to Austin to work on the Texas McGovern campaign. Bill had originally planned to begin working as a southern states coordinator for the McGovern campaign during the summer of 1971. However, he postponed those plans in order to spend that summer with Hillary, who had taken a summer job in California. The following summer, Bill took a job as the state manager of McGovern's campaign in Texas. He asked Hillary if she would be interested in joining him there. In her memoir Living History, Hillary recalled, "Bill asked if I wanted to go too. I did, but only if I had a specific job."

Hillary was tasked with registering black and Hispanic voters in South Texas on behalf of the Democratic National Committee. With the 1972 election being the first in which 18-year-olds were able to vote, the task of voter registration was much greater than in other years. In addition to registering voters, as a law student, Clinton was utilized as a legal resource.

Hillary worked alongside Sara Ehrman, with whom she bonded. She also bonded with Betsey Wright while working on the campaign, with whom she frequently would travel to Barton Springs.

Bill, meanwhile, worked closely with Eddie Bernice Johnson. He also worked with Ron Kirk (future mayor of Dallas), Ann Richards (future governor of Texas). He additionally worked with Steven Spielberg who, at the time, was a little-known television producer. He traveled frequently across the state to organize events and to hang posters in county courthouses. He spent considerable time in Dallas, where he had an office in the campaign's local headquarters on Lemmon Avenue.

The Clintons worked with Garry Mauro, a University of Texas Law School student, on the campaign. Mauro would go on to later serve as Texas Land Commissioner, and would head Bill's 1992 campaign in Texas. They also worked alongside future Austin advertising executives Roy Spence and Judy Trabulsi, who would both go on to work on Bill Clinton's presidential campaigns. Spence would also work as a media adviser to Hillary in her 2008 presidential campaign, while Trablusi supported the candidacy of Barack Obama. Both worked in support of her 2016 presidential campaign.

While working in Texas, the Clintons also networked with some donors that would later contribute to their own campaigns for political office, such as Bernard Rapoport. Occasionally, Bill would receive phone calls from former president Lyndon B. Johnson, who would inquire about the campaign effort and offer advice. Both Clintons were absent from attending their fall classes that term in order to work for the campaign. However, they both managed to ace their finals.

Nixon campaign
Incumbent president Richard Nixon emphasized on a good economy and his successes in foreign affairs, such as coming near to ending American involvement in the Vietnam War and establishing relations with China. Though he had narrowly lost the state in 1968, Texas was beginning to trend Republican, with a lone Representative pickup and a pickup of a handful of state senate seats. He campaigned in Laredo at the Laredo Air Force Base, and he also visited Harlingen. Nixon had the support of former Democratic Texas governor John Connally, who headed the group Democrats for Nixon. Connally would, however, join the Republican party in 1973. Overall, Nixon's campaigning was less so than in 1968, as he rode a good economy and incumbency to a landslide victory in the state.

Results

Results by county

See also
 United States presidential elections in Texas

Notes

References

Texas
1972 Texas elections
1972
United States
United States